Lešane is a settlement in the Suhareka municipality in south Kosovo. It is located in the Prizren region. It lies 374 m above sea level. It has an ethnic Albanian majority, and Serbian minority; in the 1991 census, it had 2381 inhabitants. The smaller settlement of Topličane has been registered with Lešane in the censuses (The 1981 data shows only Lešane data).Lešane have 200–250 home and 2800-2900 people.

Notes

References

Villages in Suva Reka